Le Rove is seaside a commune in the Bouches-du-Rhône department in the Provence-Alpes-Côte d'Azur region in Southern France. In 2019, it had a population of 5,145.

It is located on the Côte Bleue just northwest of Marseille, neighbouring its 16th arrondissement within the larger Aix-Marseille-Provence Metropolis. It consists of a main village at Le Rove which houses the town hall, as well as a variety of hamlets and other settlements.

The Rove Tunnel, the world's longest canal tunnel at 7,120 metres (23,360 ft), has its southeastern entrance situated in Marseille near Le Rove, although a sizeable portion crosses the commune underground (from the Mediterranean towards the Étang de Berre), hence its name. It has been out of service since 1963.

Transport
Le Rove is served by the Niolon TER PACA railway station (opened in 1915) on the Miramas–L'Estaque railway.

Demographics

Notable people 
 Sébastien Chato (born 1961), singer, author, composer, lived in Le Rove
 Alexandre Fabre (born 1955), actor, lives in Le Rove
 Maurice Gouiran (born 1946), thriller writer, born in Le Rove
 Malika Haimeur (born 1956), awarded the Irène Joliot-Curie Prize for Women & Business in 2009
 Franky Zapata (born 1978), creator of the Flyboard, lived in Le Rove with his workshop still there

See also
Communes of the Bouches-du-Rhône department

References

Communes of Bouches-du-Rhône
Bouches-du-Rhône communes articles needing translation from French Wikipedia